God-Emperor or God Emperor may refer to:

Historical and legendary 
Three Sovereigns and Five Emperors, a group of mythological rulers or deities in ancient northern China said to be god emperors
Sapa Inca, the Emperor of the Inca Empire, viewed as a god
An emperor worshipped as a deity by an imperial cult
Imperial cult (ancient Rome) identified emperors with divinely sanctioned authority
Emperor Jimmu, first Emperor of Japan according to legend
Emperor of Japan, called Tennō, "heavenly sovereign"

Modern popular culture 
Tisroc, the Calormene ruler in The Chronicles of Narnia
Leto II Atreides, the title character in Frank Herbert's science fiction novel God Emperor of Dune (1981)
The God-Emperor of Mankind, in the fictional Imperium (Warhammer 40,000)
The Emperor, the godlike character in Andreas Eschbach's The Carpet Makers (2005)
God Emperor Doom, from Marvel's Secret Wars (2015 comic book)
God-Emperor, character in The Last Remnant role-playing video game
Donald J. Trump, 45th president of the United States, humorously referred to as such.

See also 

Christ Pantocrator, a specific depiction of Christ
Caesaropapism, the idea of combining the power of secular government with the religious power
Divine right of kings
God king, a term for a deified ruler
List of people who have been considered deities
Sacred king